The Bradbury House is a historic house in the Pacific Palisades Los Angeles, California, USA. It was designed in the Spanish Revival style by architect John Byers, and completed in 1923. Built for Lewis L Bradbury Jr Whose father, Lewis L Bradbury, commissioned the construction of the Bradbury Building in Downtown Los Angeles. It has been listed on the National Register of Historic Places since March 22, 2010.

References

Houses on the National Register of Historic Places in California
Mission Revival architecture in California
Houses in Los Angeles
Houses completed in 1923
Pacific Palisades, Los Angeles
National Register of Historic Places in Los Angeles